Ester, liberatrice del popolo ebreo is a 1673 Italian-language oratorio by Alessandro Stradella. The only surviving manuscript lacks the original ritornellos and some closed numbers. It was performed in Corpus Christi Catholic Church, NYC in 1985, and recorded by Italian early music group Il Concento, under Luca Franco Ferrari in 2001, later released on Brilliant Classics in 2012.

References

Recordings 
Alessandro Stradella: Ester - Luca Franco Ferrari, Conductor; Silvia Piccollo, Elisa Franzetti, Vicky Norrington, Riccardo Ristori, Matteo Armanino; Il Concerto Luca Franco Ferrari; 22-36 November 2001, Chiesa di San Lorenzo, Torbi di Ceranesi, Genova.  

Brilliant Classics Cat: 94297
Oratorios
Compositions by Alessandro Stradella